Acacia nanopravissima, also known as little kooka wattle, is a shrub belonging to the genus Acacia and the subgenus Phyllodineae where it is endemic to south eastern Australia.

Description
When it blooms between late August and early October, it produces racemose inflorescences with spherical flower-heads that contain seven to nine golden coloured flowers.

Distribution
It is native to a small area in north eastern Victoria around Splitters Creek as a part of open forest communities growing in shallow sediment based soils. It is confined to a small area to the south of Wulgulmerang in East Gippsland and is only found as a single small population in the upper catchment of Little River, a tributary of the Snowy River on the Wombargo Range.

See also
 List of Acacia species

References

nanopravissima
Flora of Victoria (Australia)
Plants described in 2008